Isselhorst-Avenwedde station is a railway station in the Isselhorst-Avenwedde district of the town of Gütersloh, located in North Rhine-Westphalia, Germany.

Rail services

References

Railway stations in North Rhine-Westphalia
Buildings and structures in Gütersloh (district)
Railway stations in Germany opened in 1880